Karawang HSR Station is a large class A type KCIC station located in Wanakerta, Karawang Regency, West Java, Indonesia. The station only serves the upcoming KCIC Jakarta-Bandung route.

References 

Railway stations in West Java
Railway stations scheduled to open in 2023
Proposed rail infrastructure in Indonesia